Charles Edward Fowler (born December 21, 1939) is an American politician in the state of Minnesota. He served in the Minnesota State Senate.

References

1939 births
Living people
People from Martin County, Minnesota
Democratic Party Minnesota state senators